The 1978 NCAA Division I Men's Cross Country Championships were the 40th annual cross country meet to determine the team and individual national champions of NCAA Division I men's collegiate cross country running in the United States. Held on November 20, 1978, the meet was hosted by the University of Wisconsin–Madison at the Yahara Hills Golf Course in Madison, Wisconsin. The distance for this race was 10 kilometers (6.21 miles).

All Division I cross country teams were eligible to qualify for the meet through their placement at various regional qualifying meets. In total, 29 teams and 241 individual runners contested this championship.

The team national championship was won by the UTEP Miners, their fourth title. The individual championship was won by Alberto Salazar, from Oregon, with a time of 29:29.70.

Men's title
Distance: 10,000 meters (6.21 miles)

Team Result (Top 10)

Individual Result (Top 10)

See also
NCAA Men's Division II Cross Country Championship 
NCAA Men's Division III Cross Country Championship

References
 

NCAA Cross Country Championships
NCAA Division I Cross Country Championships
NCAA Division I Cross Country Championships
NCAA Division I Cross Country Championships
Sports in Madison, Wisconsin
Track and field in Wisconsin
University of Wisconsin–Madison